Tătărești (formerly Tatar-Baurci) is a village in Cahul District, Moldova.

References

Villages of Cahul District
Chilia County